Shipley College is a General Further Education college in West Yorkshire, England,  The college is a small place mainly based in the village of Saltaire. Other Sites are used for Lifestyle and Adult Learning and include local schools and Community Centres. The buildings in Saltaire go under the names of Salt Building, Mill building, Victoria Hall and Exhibition Building. All buildings are within walking distance of each other.  Victoria Hall is only partly owned by the college.  The reception, Student Services and the Enrolment office are based in the Salt Building.

Courses offered 

There are a wide range of courses offered at Shipley College, including BTEC's as full-time courses, Apprenticeships, part-time courses and Services to Business.

See also 
 Victoria Hall, Saltaire

References 

Further education colleges in West Yorkshire
Shipley, West Yorkshire
Education in the City of Bradford